Khem Son (born 1941) is a former Cambodian cyclist. He competed in the team time trial and the individual pursuit events at the 1964 Summer Olympics.

References

External links
 

1941 births
Living people
Cambodian male cyclists
Olympic cyclists of Cambodia
Cyclists at the 1964 Summer Olympics
Place of birth missing (living people)